The National Document Fraud Unit (NDFU) is a central unit within the Home Office, based from two offices, one in Liverpool and another office near London Heathrow Airport. The NDFU is the UK's national centre for identifying travel and identity document fraud.  It provides information on genuine, forged, counterfeit and fantasy documents to law enforcement agencies nationally and overseas, working with Interpol and the International Civil Aviation Organization to establish document standards. NDFU also liaises with security document manufacturers and issuers to ensure that the UK remains a leader in the field of travel document security.

History
The NDFU has existed for over 35 years. In 2008, the work carried out by the NDFU resulted in 7800 fraudulent travel documents being identified by the UK Border Agency.

Role
The NDFU's role is to:
 Train staff from the Home Office, UK Visas and Immigration, and other government departments in identifying fraudulent travel and identity documents.
 Provide expert document examiners to analyze suspect travel and identity documents and provide expert witness testimony to the Courts of the United Kingdom.
 Gather intelligence on travel and identity document fraud.
 Provide specialist advice and forgery detection training to UK non-governmental and overseas partners.

In addition, the NDFU maintains one of the largest and most comprehensive libraries of specimen genuine and fraudulent travel documents in the world.

References

Document forgery
Fraud in the United Kingdom
Fraud organizations
London Borough of Hounslow
United Kingdom border control